Luis Manuel López Checo (born 12 July 1983) is a Dominican footballer who plays as a defender who plays for Jarabacoa FC.

Career

Club
López's first career club was Club Herminio Padrón. In the following years, López had spells with Club Ilusión Pibe, Moca FC, Los 30 FC, Ojo de Agua and San Francisco. He then featured for Barcelona Atlético and Los 30 de Villa Tapia in the Primera División de Republica Dominicana. In 2015, López joined Liga Dominicana de Fútbol side Cibao FC. He subsequently made twelve professional football appearances in the following campaign.

International
López previously represented the Dominican Republic U20s. In 2015, he was called up to the senior team for 2018 FIFA World Cup qualifiers with Belize. He made his international debut on 14 June during a 3–0 loss away to Belize.

Career statistics
.

References

External links

1983 births
Living people
People from Hermanas Mirabal Province
Dominican Republic footballers
Association football central defenders

Moca FC players
Club Barcelona Atlético players
Liga Dominicana de Fútbol players
Cibao FC players
Dominican Republic international footballers